Nasrabad (also Romanized as Naşrābād; also known as Noşratābād and Nusratābād) is a city and capital of Nasrabad District, in Torbat-e Jam County, Razavi Khorasan Province, Iran. At the 2006 census, its population was 6,835, in 1,599 families.

References 

Populated places in Torbat-e Jam County
Cities in Razavi Khorasan Province